Audrey Dalton (born 21 January 1934) is an Irish-born former film and television actress who mostly worked in the United States during the Golden Age of Hollywood.

Biography
Dalton was born in Dublin, Ireland, the daughter of Alice Shannon and soldier and film producer Emmet Dalton, the third of their five children. Her father was a recipient of the Military Cross for his service in the British Army in World War I. During the Irish Civil War, he was a major general in the National Army. 

She attended the Convent of the Sacred Heart in Dublin. After the family moved to London, she studied acting in the Royal Academy of Dramatic Art (RADA). She moved to the United States on 17 March 1952, for a part in The Girls of Pleasure Island. She took a break from acting in 1953 after the birth of her daughter, but returned in 1954, appearing in her first roles without using her British accent. 

In 1977 she divorced James H. Brown, father of her four children, after 25 years of marriage, and in 1979 married Rod F. Simenz, an engineer.

Among her many television appearances were six episodes of Wagon Train between 1958 and 1964. In 1958, she was Ellen Curry, the recipient of a million-dollar check in a 1958 episode of The Millionaire. She made a guest appearance on Perry Mason in 1961 as Kate Eastman in "The Case of the Injured Innocent." In 1962 she appeared on Gunsmoke (S8:E18) in "The Renegades".

Filmography

My Cousin Rachel (1952) as Louise Kendall
The Girls of Pleasure Island (1953) as Hester Halyard
Titanic (1953) as Annette Sturges
Casanova's Big Night (1954) as Elena Di Gambetta
Drum Beat (1954/I) as Nancy Meek
The Prodigal (1955) as Ruth
Confession (1955) as Louise Nelson
The 20th Century-Fox Hour (1956, TV Series) as Carey Rydal
Hold Back the Night (1956) as Kitty
The Monster That Challenged the World (1957) as Gail MacKenzie
Lux Video Theatre (1956–1957, TV Series) as Jean / Barbara / Romo
The Bob Cummings Show (1957, TV Series) as Rita
Thundering Jets (1958) as Susan Blair
The Millionaire (1958, TV Series) as Ellen Curry
Man with a Camera (1958, TV Series) as Sharon Rogers
Separate Tables (1958) as Jean
Disneyland (1959, TV Series) as Mrs. Cunningham
Lone Texan (1959) as Susan Harvey
This Other Eden (1959) as Maire McRoarty
Thriller (22 November 1960, TV Series) as Norine in "The Prediction"
Dante (1961, TV Series) as Hazel Kennicut
The Aquanauts (1961, TV Series) as Sylvia Jurgen
The Tab Hunter Show (1961, TV Series) as Ariel Evans
National Velvet (1961, TV Series) as Fiona Mulcahey
Bat Masterson (1958–1961, TV Series) as Cally Armitage / Abby Chancellor / Abigail Feather
Lock Up (1961, TV Series) as Susan Carter
Michael Shayne (1961, TV Series) as Pat Marshall
Bringing Up Buddy (1961, TV Series) as Mary Beth Davenport / Ami Davenport
Whispering Smith (1961, TV Series) as April Fanshaw
Mr. Sardonicus (1961) as Baroness Maude Sardonicus
The Investigators (1961, TV Series) as Constance Moreno (episode "The Oracle")
Perry Mason (1961, TV Series) as Kate Eastman
Checkmate (1961, TV Series) as Ann Miles
King of Diamonds (1962, TV Series) as Lola Hayes
Bonanza (1962, TV Series) as Melinda Banning
Thriller (1960–1962, TV Series) as Meg O'Danagh Wheeler / Nesta Roberts / Norine Burton
Kraft Mystery Theater (1962, TV Series) as Marion
Ripcord (1962, TV Series) as Janice Dean
Gunsmoke (1963, TV Series) as Lavinia
Death Valley Days (1963, TV Series) as Mary O'Connell
The Wide Country (1963, TV Series) as Nancy Kidwell
The Dakotas (1963, TV Series) as Ronnie Kane
Temple Houston (1963, TV Series) as Amy Hart
Dr. Kildare (1964, TV Series) as Jo Grant
Wagon Train (1958–1964, TV Series) as Danna Bannon / Lola Medina / Nancy Bigelow / Mary Naughton / Laura Grady / Harriet Field
Kitten with a Whip (1964) as Virginia Stratton
The Bounty Killer (1965) as Carole Ridgeway
Voyage to the Bottom of the Sea (1965, TV Series) as Lydia Parrish
Laredo (1965, TV Series) as Alice Coverly
The Big Valley (1965–1966, TV Series) as Amy / Ann
Insight (1966, TV Series)
The Wild Wild West (1966, TV Series) as Veda Singh
The Girl from U.N.C.L.E. (1966, TV Series) as Mrs. Wainright
Dragnet 1967 (1967, TV Series) as Patricia Filmore
Me and Benjy (1967, TV Movie) as Ruth
Family Affair (1967, TV Series) as Mrs. Thompson
Police Woman (1974–1978, TV Series) as Mrs. Hunter / Rose Hess (final appearance)

References

External links

 
 
 Interview May, 2014 in the Ft. Wayne News-Sentinel
 Audrey Dalton interview at Classic Film & TV Cafe
 

1934 births
Living people
20th-century Irish actresses
Actresses from Dublin (city)
Alumni of RADA
Irish expatriates in the United Kingdom
Irish expatriates in the United States
Irish film actresses
Irish television actresses